The 1989 Puerto Rico Open was a women's tennis tournament played on outdoor hard courts at the Hyatt Regency Cerromar Hotel in Dorado, Puerto Rico that was part of the Category 2 tier of the 1989 WTA Tour. It was the seventh edition of the tournament and was held from October 23 through October 29, 1989. Fourth-seeded Laura Gildemeister won the singles title and earned $17,000 first-prize money.

Finals

Singles
 Laura Gildemeister defeated  Gigi Fernández 6–1, 6–2
 It was Gildemeister's 2nd singles title of the year and the 4th, and last, of her career.

Doubles
 Cammy MacGregor  /  Ronni Reis vs.  Gigi Fernández /  Robin White final rained out

References

External links
 ITF tournament edition details
 Tournament draws

Puerto Rico Open
Puerto Rico Open (tennis)
Puerto Rico Open, 1989